Kidlington railway station opened in 1855 on the Oxford and Rugby Railway to serve the adjacent Oxfordshire village of Kidlington, and act as a railhead for the town of Woodstock,  away. It became a junction station in 1890 upon the opening of the Blenheim and Woodstock Branch Line, and served the area for over 100 years before falling victim to the programme of closures initiated by the Beeching Report in 1964.

History

Opening 
Although the Oxford and Rugby Railway opened in 1850, it was a further five years before the Brunelian station building was completed. Originally named Woodstock Road, the station was inconveniently sited at the northern end of Kidlington, around 20 minutes walk from the village centre. The station, a conventional two-platform stopping place with modest goods facilities, defied the railway convention that station buildings were usually sited on the platform nearest the settlement that they were purporting to serve. In this case, Kidlington village was to the east, whereas the station buildings were constructed on the western side, leaving the station effectively back-to-front.

Goods facilities 
When originally opened, the station was provided with a small goods yard and run-round loop for goods traffic on the down side. In addition, it was likely that two sidings had been installed: one to serve the loading dock to the rear of the down platform, and one connected to a goods shed of typical Great Western Railway design. The  by  shed was constructed out of yellowish brickwork and had five bays with brick pilasters.

Towards the end of the 19th century, the goods yard siding was extended across the station approach to serve a timber yard which had opened to the west of the station. This arrangement not only blocked passengers' access to the ticket office when wagons were being shunted, but also blocked all means of entry to the timber yard. An additional siding was therefore laid to provide a bypass for the shed which effectively put it on a short loop. Another siding was laid across the road in 1923 when Oxford Farmers Ltd opened a bacon factory.

Passenger facilities 

However, upon closer inspection they all were constructed with Cotswold rather than Italianate features. Kidlington resembled  on the Cornish Main Line, but its hipped roof and larger canopy made it seem at first glance very different.

Substantial station buildings constructed out of local oolitic limestone were provided on both platforms. The larger of the two was the down building, crowned by three tall Italianate chimneys, which comprised a waiting room, ladies' waiting room and ladies' toilet. The up building was much smaller but similar in size and contained a large waiting room, the booking hall, a parcels office, the stationmaster's office, a porter's room and a gents' toilet. A canopied passenger footbridge was added at the turn of the 19th century. Both platforms had picturesque gardens, complete with rustic arches and flower baskets.

When Kidlington became a junction station in 1890 upon the opening of the  Blenheim and Woodstock Branch Line, a bay platform was constructed alongside the country end of the down platform on the alignment of a former goods siding. The down platform itself was extended north towards the Banbury Road bridge to allow sufficient room for terminating branch services. The station was also renamed Kidlington to avoid confusion with the new  station.

Decline and closure 
By the 1950s, rationalisation and cuts in the frequency of services led to passengers alighting at Kidlington having to wait two hours for a connecting train to Oxford. Passenger numbers had fallen from 23,000 in the 1930s to less than 9,000 in 1952, with each train carrying on average 5 to 6 passengers, and sometimes even running empty. In Kidlington, due to the inconvenient siting of the station, villagers preferred the more convenient bus services to Oxford.

British Railways closed the Blenheim and Woodstock Branch Line in 1954, leaving Kidlington to survive for a further ten years with a service of around six trains a day. A reprieve was given by the Government to Tackley and Heyford, but Bletchington and Kidlington closed in November 1964, despite it being the largest village on the Cherwell Valley Line between Oxford and Banbury..

Present day

Remains 
After closure, Kidlington station was used by a printing firm although the up buildings and platform were demolished. By 1973, all that remained was the down building and goods shed. The shed was at that time occupied by a plastics firm, whilst the parcels office was an antique shop and the booking office had become a denture repairers. The signal box was demolished in 1970. The passenger footbridge was taken down and re-erected near Didcot North Junction where it replaced a similar bridge which had been badly damaged following a derailment.

The goods shed was demolished in 1984 and most of the surrounding goods yard is now occupied by an industrial estate known as The Station Field. The connection with the former Woodstock branch has been obscured by deep ballasting on the main line.

Proposed new stations 

There have been calls since the 1970s for the reopening of Kidlington station as a Park and ride facility for local commuters. The new station should, it was proposed, be reopened on a site closer to the village centre, such as Roundham Lane Crossing. The idea was enthusiastically received by British Rail, which called for the scheme to be backed by financial contributions from local authorities. These were not forthcoming and the land earmarked for the station was redeveloped, leaving insufficient room for an approach road and car park.

Since the 1980s, Oxfordshire County Council has advocated a new Kidlington station on the Cherwell Valley Line on land beside Lyne Road between Flatford Place and Thorne Close.

Train operating company Chiltern Railways constructed a new station on the Oxford to Bicester Line just south of Kidlington as part of its Project Evergreen 3 development programme.

In January 2017, the council called plans for an 'Oxford Metro' as part of the Oxford station upgrade which would allow this to happen and could include a new station at Kidlington.

The current Cherwell District Council plan reserves land for a station beside Sandy Lane level crossing.

References

Sources

External links 
 Station and Line on navigable 1947 O.S. map
 Photograph of station today

Disused railway stations in Oxfordshire
Former Great Western Railway stations
Railway stations in Great Britain opened in 1855
Railway stations in Great Britain closed in 1964
Beeching closures in England
1855 establishments in England
Kidlington